Stagnicola palustris is a species of air-breathing freshwater snail, an aquatic pulmonate gastropod mollusk in the family Lymnaeidae, the pond snails.

Taxonomy
Stagnicola turricula  is a synonym of Stagnicola palustris, because they are not genetically independent, but S. curricula is still sometimes listed separately.

Description
The dimensions of the shell of an adult of this species are from about 10 to 18 mm in length, and about 6 to 10 mm in width.

Distribution 
This species of snail occurs in European countries and islands including:
 Croatia
 Stagnicola palustris – Czech Republic – data deficient (DD)
 Germany – (Arten der Vorwarnliste)
 Great Britain
 Netherlands
 Poland
 Slovakia

Habitat 
This snail lives in shallow, well-aerated freshwater habitats.

See also
Stagnicola palustris-like snails in the North America are named Stagnicola elodes, but that may be the same species.

References

External links

Lymnaeidae
Gastropods described in 1774
Taxa named by Otto Friedrich Müller